The 2012–13 Seton Hall Pirates men's basketball team represented Seton Hall University during the 2012–13 NCAA Division I men's basketball season. The Pirates, led by head coach Kevin Willard, played its home games in Newark, New Jersey at the Prudential Center and were members of the Big East Conference. They finished the season 15–18, 3–15 in Big East play to finish in a tie for 13th place. They lost in the second round of the Big East tournament to Syaracuse.

Roster

Schedule
 
|-
!colspan=9| Exhibition

|-
!colspan=9| Regular season

|-
!colspan=9| 2013 Big East men's basketball tournament

References

Seton Hall
Seton Hall Pirates men's basketball seasons
Seton Hall
Seton Hall